Hans Nicklas Bergh is a Swedish footballer who plays for Eskilstuna City as a goalkeeper.

He spent his youth playing for Triangelns IK and IFK Eskilstuna before making his senior debut in 2000. After two years playing in the third division, Bergh moved up a division to join Superettan club Eskilstuna City. It was there that he first met Stefan Soderberg, the club's sporting director, who took up the same role at his next club. Three and a half years later, Bergh was signed by AIK as back-up to Daniel Örlund. In 2007, Bergh spent time on loan with Enköpings SK and made 18 appearances in the Superettan. During a six-year stint with AIK he made 12 appearances in all competitions and seven in the Allsvenskan – the first division of Swedish football. In 2011, Bergh returned to Eskilstuna City, who were now playing in the fourth division.

Honours
AIK
Allsvenskan: 2009
Svenska Cupen: 2009

References

1982 births
Living people
People from Eskilstuna
Swedish footballers
Association football goalkeepers
AIK Fotboll players
Enköpings SK players
Superettan players
Allsvenskan players
Ettan Fotboll players
IFK Eskilstuna players
Eskilstuna City FK players
Sportspeople from Södermanland County